The 23rd Actors and Actresses Union Awards ceremony was held on 10 March 2014 at the Teatro Coliseum in Madrid. The gala was hosted by Llum Barrera and Secun de la Rosa.

Winners and nominees 
The winners and nominees are listed as follows:

Film

Television

Theatre

Newcomers

References 

Actors and Actresses Union Awards
2014 in Madrid
2014 television awards
2014 film awards
2014 theatre awards
March 2014 events in Europe